Svirzh may refer to:

Geography
Svirzh (Desna), tributary of Desna
Svirzh (Dnieper), tributary of Dnieper

Places
Svirzh, Lviv Oblast, village in Lviv Raion
Svirzh Castle, castle in the above village
Svirzh, Sumy Oblast, village in Shostka Raion